Valman may refer to:

 Valman language, a Torricelli language of Papua New Guinea
 Valman, Iran, a village in Markazi Province, Iran

See also
 
 
 Wallman/Wallmann
 Walman/Walmann